Jason Nieh is a professor of Computer Science and co-director of the Software Systems Laboratory at Columbia University. He is most well known for his work on virtualization.  He was one of the early pioneers of operating-system-level virtualization, introducing key concepts such as process namespaces and file system layers which led to the development of Linux containers and Docker.  He was an early proponent of desktop virtualization, conducting many of the early studies demonstrating the feasibility of Virtual Desktop Infrastructure. He developed and influenced many key technologies for Arm virtualization, including the Linux ARM hypervisor, KVM ARM, and Arm architecture features to support virtualization host extensions, nested virtualization, and confidential computing.  He was also the first to introduce virtual machines and virtual appliances to teach hands-on computer science courses such as operating systems, which has now become common practice at many universities.
Nieh was the technical advisor to nine States regarding the Microsoft antitrust settlement and has been an expert witness before the United States International Trade Commission. He was Chief Scientist of Desktone, which was purchased by VMware, and currently holds the same position at CertiK.

Recognition
He won the Sigma Xi Young Investigator Award, seven IBM Awards, and various best paper awards including the 2004 International Conference on Mobile Computing and Networking Best Paper Award, the 2011 Symposium on Operating Systems Principles Best Paper Award, the 2012 SIGCSE Best Paper Award, and the 2021 Jay Lepreau Award.
He was elected as an ACM Fellow in 2019 "for contributions to operating systems, virtualization, and computer science education". and an IEEE Fellow in 2019 "for contributions to virtualization, scheduling, and mobile computing". He was the only computer scientist to receive a 2021 Guggenheim Fellowship.

References

External links
Jason Nieh

Living people
20th-century births
American computer scientists
Columbia University faculty
Year of birth missing (living people)
Fellows of the Association for Computing Machinery